Daniël Adolf Camerling Helmolt (9 May 1886 – 18 September 1960) was a Dutch equestrian. He competed in two events at the 1936 Summer Olympics.

References

External links
 
 

1886 births
1960 deaths
Dutch male equestrians
Dutch dressage riders
Olympic equestrians of the Netherlands
Equestrians at the 1936 Summer Olympics
Sportspeople from Haarlem
20th-century Dutch people